William Henry "Harry" Taylor (birth unknown – death unknown) was an English professional rugby league footballer who played in the 1890s, 1900s and 1910s.

Playing career

International honours
Harry Taylor won caps for England while at Hull in 1908 against Wales, and New Zealand, and won 3 caps for Great Britain while at Hull in 1908 against New Zealand (3 matches) in which he was captain in all 3 tests. He was the captain against New Zealand in the first ever Test for Great Britain, at Headingley Rugby Stadium, Leeds on Saturday 25 January 1908.

County honours
Harry Taylor won 18-cap(s) for Yorkshire while at Hull, including against New Zealand at Belle Vue, Wakefield on Wednesday 18 December 1907.

Challenge Cup Final appearances
Harry Taylor played , and was captain in Hull FC's 0–14 defeat by Hunslet in the 1907–08 Challenge Cup Final during the 1907–08 season at Fartown Ground, Huddersfield on Saturday 25 April 1908, in front of a crowd of 18,000, played , and was captain in Hull FC's 0–17 defeat by Wakefield Trinity in the 1908–09 Challenge Cup Final during the 1908–09 season at Headingley Rugby Stadium, Leeds on Saturday 24 April 1909, in front of a crowd of 23,587, and played  in the 7–7 draw with Leeds in the 19–0910 Challenge Cup Final during the 1909–10 season at Fartown Ground, Huddersfield, on Saturday 16 April 1910, in front of a crowd of 19,413, this was the first Challenge Cup Final to be drawn, but he did not play in the 12–26 defeat by Leeds in the 1909–10 Challenge Cup Final replay at Fartown Ground, Huddersfield, on Monday 18 April 1910, in front of a crowd of 11,608.

References

England national rugby league team players
English rugby league players
Great Britain national rugby league team captains
Great Britain national rugby league team players
Hull F.C. captains
Hull F.C. coaches
Hull F.C. players
Place of birth missing
Place of death missing
Rugby league fullbacks
Year of birth missing
Year of death missing
Yorkshire rugby league team players